Hibbertia planifolia is a species of flowering plant in the family Dilleniaceae and is endemic to a restricted area of New South Wales. It is a small, prostrate shrub with triangular leaves with the narrower end towards the base, and yellow flowers arranged singly, with eight to eleven stamens and about the same number of staminodes arranged in groups around the two carpels.

Description
Flowering occurs from July to September.

Taxonomy
Hibbertia planifolia was first formally described in 2012 by Hellmut R. Toelken in the Journal of the Adelaide Botanic Gardens from specimens collected by John L. Boorman near Yerranderie in 1915. The specific epithet (planifolia) means "flat-leaved".

Distribution and habitat
This hibbertia is only known from two collections that were growing in scrub vegetation in rocky places on the Central Tablelands of New South Wales. The species has not been collected since 1967.

See also
List of Hibbertia species

References

planifolia
Flora of New South Wales
Plants described in 2012
Taxa named by Hellmut R. Toelken